Neuropsychoanalysis integrates both neuroscience and psychoanalysis, to create a balanced and equal study of the human mind. This overarching approach began as advances in neuroscience lead to breakthroughs which held pertinent information for the field of psychoanalysis.  Despite advantages for these fields to interconnect, there is some concern that too much emphasis on neurobiological physiology of the brain will undermine the importance of dialogue and exploration that is foundational to the field of psychoanalysis. Critics will also point to the qualitative and subjective nature of the field of psychoanalysis, claiming it cannot be fully reconciled with the quantitative and objective nature of neuroscientific research.  However, despite this critique, proponents of the field of neuropsychoanalysis remind critics that the father of psychoanalysis, Sigmund Freud himself, began his career as a neuroanatomist, further arguing that research in this category proves that the psychodynamic effects of the mind are inextricably linked to neural activity in the brain. Indeed, neuroscientific progress has created a shared study of many of the same cognitive phenomenon, and proponents for a distinct field under the heading of neuropsychoanalysis point to the ability for observation of both the subjective mind and empirical evidence in neurobiology to provide greater understanding and greater curative methods. Therefore, neurospsychoanalysis aims to bring a field, often viewed as belonging more to the humanities than the sciences, into the scientific realm and under the umbrella of neuroscience, distinct from psychoanalysis, and yet adding to the plethora of insight garnered from it.

History 
Neuropsychoanalysis as a discipline can be traced as far back as Sigmund Freud's manuscript, "Project for a Scientific Psychology". Written in 1895, but only published posthumously, Freud developed his theories of the neurobiological function of the storage of memory in this work. His statement, based on his theory that memory is biologically stored in the brain by, "a permanent alteration following an event", had a prophetic insight into the empirical discoveries that would corroborate these theories close to 100 years later. Freud speculated that psychodynamics and neurobiology would eventually reunite as one field of study. While time would eventually prove him correct to some degree, the latter half of the 20th century only saw a very gradual movement in this direction with only a few individuals championing this line of thought.

Significant advances in neuroscience throughout the 20th century created a clearer understanding of the functionality of the brain, which have vastly enhanced the way we view the mind. This began in the 1930s with the invention of electroencephalography, which enabled imaging of the brain as never seen before. A decade later the use of dynamic localization, or the lesion method, further shed light onto the interaction of systems in the brain. Computerized tomography lead to even greater understanding of the interaction within the brain, and finally the invention of multiple scan technologies in the 1990s, the fMRI, PET, and the SPECT gave researchers empirical evidence of neurobiological processes.

It was in 1999, just before the turn of the century, that the term "neuropsychoanalysis" was used in a new journal entitled with the same name. This term once was hyphenated to indicate that the conjoining of the two fields of study did not suggest that they had been fully integrated, but rather that this new line of scientific inquiry was interdisciplinary. With repeated use, the hyphen was lost, and the name appears as we see it today.

Theoretical base

Dual-aspect monism 
Neuropsychoanalysis is best described as a marriage between neuroscience and psychoanalysis. However, its relationship to the broader field of neuropsychology – which relates the biological brain to psychological functions and behavior – cannot be denied. Indeed, neuropsychoanalysis further seeks to remedy classical neurology's exclusion of the subjective mind.

The subjective mind, that is, sensations, thoughts, feelings and consciousness, can seem antithetical to the cellular matter that makes up the neurobiology of the brain. Indeed, while Freud is most often credited with being the seminal creator of the study of the mind in mordern terms, it was Descartes who concluded that mind and brain were two entirely different kinds of stuff. Accordingly, he invented the "dualism" of the mind, the mind-body dichotomy.  Body is one kind of thing, and mind (or spirit or soul) is another.  But since this second kind of stuff does not lend itself to scientific inquiry, many of today's psychologists and neuroscientists have seemingly rejected Cartesian dualism.

Neuropsychoanalysis meets this challenge via dual-aspect monism, sometimes referred to as perspectivism.  That is, we are monistic.  Our brains, including mind, are made of one kind of stuff, cells, but we perceive this stuff in two different ways.

Psychoanalysis as a foundation 
Perhaps because Freud himself began his career as a neurologist, psychoanalysis has given the field of neuroscience the platform upon which many of its scientific hypotheses were founded. With the field of psychoanalysis suffering from what many see as a decline in innovation and popularity, a call for new approaches and a more scientific methodology is long overdue. The history of neuropsychoanalysis therefore, goes some way in explaining why some consider it the logical conclusion, and representative of an evolution that psychoanalysis was in need of.  Since the mind itself is viewed as purely ontological, our appreciation of reality is dependent on neurobiological functions of the brain, which we can use to observe "subjectively," from inside, how we feel and what we think.  Freud refined this kind of observation into free association.  He claimed that this is the best technique that we have for perceiving complex mental functions that simple introspection will not reveal.  Through psychoanalysis, we can discover mind's unconscious functioning.

Neuroscience as a foundation 
Due to the very nature of neuropsychoanalysis, those working in this burgeoning field have been able to draw useful insights from a number of distinguished neuroscientists, indeed many of these now serve on the editorial board of the journal Neuropsychoanalysis. Some of these more notable names foundational to the development of neuropsychoanalysis include:

 Antonio Damasio 
 Eric Kandel 
 Joseph LeDoux
 Helen Mayberg
 Jaak Panksepp
 VS Ramachandran
 Oliver Sacks
 Mark Solms

Neuroscientists, often studying the same cognitive functions of the brain as psychoanalysts, do so in quantitative methods such as dissection post mortem, small lesions administered to create certain curative effects, or with the visual and objective aid of brain imaging, all of which enable researchers to trace neurochemical pathways and build a more accurate understanding of the physical functioning of the brain. Another branch of neuroscience also observes the "mind" from outside, that is, by means of neurological examination. This is often done in the form of physical tests, such as questionnaires, the Boston Naming test or Wisconsin Sorting, creating bisecting lines, acting out how one performs daily tasks such as a screwdriver, just to name a few. Neurologists can compare the changes in psychological function that the neurological examination shows with the associated changes in the brain, either post mortem or by means of modern imaging technology. Much of neuroscience aims to break down and tease out the cognitive and biological functions behind both conscious and unconscious actions within the brain. In this way it is no different than psychoanalysis, which has had similar goals since its inception. Therefore, to ignore the additional insight neuroscience can offer psychoanalysis would be to limit a huge source of knowledge that can only enhance psychoanalysis as a whole.

Models of pathologies

Depression                          
Heinz Böker and Rainer Krähenman proposed a model of depression as dysregulation of the relationship between the self and the other. This psychodynamic model, is related to the neurobiological model of the default mode network, DMN, and the executive network, EN, of the brain, noting experimentally the DMN seemed to be more active in depressed patients. The psychological construct of rumination is conceptualized which is experimentally more common in depressed patients, is viewed as equivalent to the cognitive processing of the self, and therefore the activation of the DMN. Similarly, experimentally measurable constructs of attribution bias are viewed as being related to this "cognitive processing of self". It has been shown that forms of psychodynamic therapy for depression have effects on the activation of several areas of the brain.

Research directions 
Neuropsychoanalytic relate unconscious (and sometimes conscious) functioning  discovered through the techniques of psychoanalysis or experimental psychology to underlying brain processes.  Among the ideas explored in recent research are the following:

 "Consciousness" is limited (5-9 bits of information) compared to emotional and unconscious thinking based in the limbic system. Note: Solm's book showed as reference in the footnote does not provide such an information. It may be confused with the capacity of short-term memory.
 Secondary-process, reality-oriented thinking can be understood as frontal lobe executive control systems.
 Dreams, confabulations, and other expressions of primary-process thinking are meaningful, wish-fulfilling manifestations of the loss of frontal executive control of mesocortical and mesolimbic "seeking" systems.
 Freud's "libido" corresponds to a dopaminergic seeking system
 Drives can be understood as a series of basic emotions (prompts to action) anchored in pontine regions, specifically the periaqueductal gray, and projecting to cortex: play; seeking; caring; fear; anger; sadness.  Seeking is constantly active; the others seek appropriate consummations (corresponding to Freud's "dynamic" unconscious).
 Seemingly rational and conscious decisions are driven from the limbic system by emotions which are unconscious.

 Infantile amnesia (the absence of memory for the first years of life) occurs because the verbal left hemisphere becomes activated later, in the second or third year of life, after the non-verbal right hemisphere.  But infants can and do have procedural and emotional memories.
 Infants' first-year experiences of attachment and second-year (approximately) experiences of disapproval lay down pathways that regulate emotions and profoundly affect adult personality.
 Oedipal behaviors (observable in primates) can be understood as the effort to integrate lust systems (testosterone-driven), romantic love (dopamine-driven), and attachment (oxytocin-driven) in relation to key persons in the environment.
 Differences between the sexes are more biologically-based and less environmentally-driven than Freud believed.

See also
 Clinical neuroscience
 List of psychology disciplines

References

External links

Cognitive neuroscience
Cognitive psychology
Psychoanalysis